Badaun Lok Sabha constituency (formerly known as Budaun Lok Sabha constituency) is one of the 80 Lok Sabha (parliamentary) constituencies in Uttar Pradesh state in India.

Assembly segments 
Presently, Badaun Lok Sabha constituency comprises five Vidhan Sabha (legislative assembly) segments. These are:

Members of Parliament

Election Results

General election 2019

General election 2014

General election 2009

See also
 Badaun district
 List of Constituencies of the Lok Sabha

Notes

References

 Badaun : Lok Sabha Election Results from 1971

Lok Sabha constituencies in Uttar Pradesh
Politics of Budaun district